Superman/Batman: Public Enemies is a 2009 American animated superhero film based on the DC Comics story arc "Public Enemies" in the Superman/Batman comic book series, written by Jeph Loeb and Ed McGuinness, which focused on Superman and Batman teaming up to prevent a meteorite from striking Earth, and taking down Lex Luthor, who has been elected President of the United States. Directed by Sam Liu and released by Warner Bros. Animation on September 29, 2009. It is the sixth film of the DC Universe Animated Original Movies. The film received generally positive reviews upon release. Tim Daly from Superman: The Animated Series and Kevin Conroy Batman: The Animated Series returned.

Plot
Lex Luthor has been elected President of the United States during a severe nationwide economic depression. Under his leadership, the economy begins to thrive, and he assembles a force of government-employed superheroes consisting of Captain Atom, Katana, Black Lightning, Power Girl, Starfire, and Major Force. Despite Power Girl's enthusiasm about the peace and stability and Captain Atom's loyalty to the government, Superman and Batman maintain their distrust toward Luthor.

The United States government discovers a massive Kryptonite meteor hurtling toward Earth. Instead of asking superheroes for aid, Luthor decides to destroy it with nuclear missiles. Luthor arranges a meeting with Superman in Gotham City under the pretense of a truce, only to result in a battle with the hired Metallo against Superman and Batman, in which Metallo manages to injure them both before an unknown assailant kills Metallo. On national television, Luthor pins Metallo's murder on Superman, using altered footage of their battle to implicate him as well as a baseless claim that Kryptonite radiation can affect Superman's judgment, then places a billion-dollar bounty on Superman.

Batman and Superman break into S.T.A.R. Labs seeking information on the meteor and finding Metallo's remains; they realize that a radioactive energy blast is what killed him, and it was made to look like Superman's heat vision. An army of villains looking to collect the bounty attacks them. Superman and Batman easily overpower most of the villains while Captain Atom defeats the rest with a giant energy blast. All of Luthor's superhero team except Power Girl, whose loyalties are divided, attempt to capture the heroic duo until Superman creates a twister using his super-speed, and the two heroes escape with Power Girl.

In Metropolis, Power Girl admits that she does not believe Superman killed Metallo and that she doesn’t like Luthor. Luthor's superheroes catch up and the fight begins anew with Power Girl aiding Batman and Superman until Batman deduces that Major Force killed Metallo under Luthor's orders and goads him into admitting it in front of everyone. When Major Force snaps and tries to kill him, an angry Power Girl punches him in the stomach hard enough to rupture his containment suit, releasing his radiation. Captain Atom, who was listening nearby, manages to absorb the energy, disintegrating Major Force and leaving him comatose.

Meanwhile, the missiles fail due to the sheer amount of radiation the meteor gives off detonating them before impact. Amanda Waller discovers that Luthor has secretly been taking a serum composed of strength-enhancing steroids and liquid Kryptonite. Luthor then informs Waller that he will let the meteor hit the Earth as he plans to rebuild society in his image, making himself Earth's single leader. Batman and Superman battle Captain Marvel and Hawkman before breaking into Luthor's base of operations to retrieve data on the meteor. Luthor refuses to relinquish the data, going so far as to erase it from the lab computers, but Waller gives them a copy. Batman, Superman, and Power Girl fly off to Tokyo to deliver the data to Toyman, who has already built a giant rocket-propelled spacecraft, intending to use it as a large missile to stop the meteor. Waller and the military then attempt to arrest Luthor with the discovery of his world-domination scheme, but he injects himself with more Kryptonite steroids and dons a power suit equipped with Kryptonite weaponry. After escaping Waller and the military, Luthor follows Superman and Batman overseas, intending to kill Superman himself.

After Batman and Superman arrive at Toyman's lab, he shows them the spacecraft, which resembles a giant, robotic composite version of Superman and Batman. With the data, Toyman is able to calculate the necessary reinforcements needed for the rocket so it will not explode before impact. Unfortunately, Luthor arrives and neutralizes Power Girl, Superman, and Batman,  then disables the rocket's remote guidance systems so that it will not take off by itself. With no other choice left, Batman decides to fly the rocket himself even in spite of Superman's protests. Though initially faring poorly against Luthor and his power suit, Superman eventually gains the upper hand when they reach Metropolis, and disables his power suit. Luthor's team arrives with a recovered Captain Atom, who apprehends Luthor. Batman succeeds in destroying the meteor, and Superman finds him alive in an escape pod.

With the truth of Metallo's death now public knowledge, Superman is cleared of the murder charge, while Luthor is arrested and taken away to face trial and impeachment for his crimes. Batman returns to Gotham City while the Daily Planets star journalist, Lois Lane, arrives and happily embraces the Man of Steel.

Cast
 Tim Daly as Kal-El/Clark Kent/Superman
 Kevin Conroy as Bruce Wayne/Batman
 Clancy Brown as Lex Luthor
 Xander Berkeley as Captain Atom
 Corey Burton as Captain Marvel (credited), Solomon Grundy (uncredited)
 Ricardo Antonio Chavira as Major Force
 Allison Mack as Power Girl
 John C. McGinley as Metallo
 CCH Pounder as Amanda Waller
 LeVar Burton as Black Lightning
 Calvin Tran as Toyman / Hiro Okamura
 Mark Jonathan Davis as Newscaster
 Brian George as Gorilla Grodd
 Jennifer Hale as Starfire, Killer Frost (uncredited)
 Rachael MacFarlane as Nightshade, Lady Shiva (uncredited), Billy Batson (uncredited)
 Alan Oppenheimer as Alfred Pennyworth
 Andrea Romano as Giganta, Computer (uncredited)
 Bruce Timm as Mongul
 Michael Gough as Hawkman (uncredited), Captain Cold (uncredited)
 Jonathan Adams as General (uncredited)

Although voice actress Jennifer Hale receives screen credit for playing Starfire, the character does not speak in the released version of the film and Hale is not credited for playing Killer Frost, a role she reprised from Justice League and Justice League Unlimited.

In addition to Jennifer Hale's uncredited reprisal of Killer Frost, actors that reprise their roles from the DC animated universe include Clancy Brown, Kevin Conroy, Tim Daly, and CCH Pounder, who reprise their roles as Lex Luthor, Batman, Superman, and Amanda Waller, respectively.

Soundtrack

Reception

IGN reviewed both the standard and Blu-ray versions of the movie positively, awarding an 8.0 rating. This surpassed IGN review of Superman: Doomsday, Batman: Gotham Knight, and Green Lantern: First Flight. The review score matched that of Justice League: The New Frontier.

At the DVD sales chart, Superman/Batman: Public Enemies opened at #5, selling 197,626 in the first week for revenue of $3,222,460. As of today, 527,482 units have been sold translating to $7,911,279 in revenue (This does not include rentals/Blu-ray sales). This makes Public Enemies the second highest selling DVD only behind Superman: Doomsday and the third most profitable of the ten movies in the DC Universe Animated Original Movies line-up. The film has currently earned a total of $11,037,595 from domestic home video sales.

Home media

Superman/Batman: Public Enemies was released on standard DVD in single and double disc editions, along with a high definition Blu-ray release, on September 29, 2009. Special features for the double disc edition include an inside look of Wonder Woman, Batman: Gotham Knight, Justice League: The New Frontier, and Green Lantern: First Flight, DC Comics' 2009 crossover event Blackest Night, two production featurettes, a sneak peek of Justice League: Crisis on Two Earths, trailers of Green Lantern: First Flight, Fringe, and Batman: Arkham Asylum, digital copy download, and two episodes of Superman: The Animated Series picked by Bruce Timm. The Blu-ray edition has all the features of the double disc standard definition release including three additional Justice League episodes selected by Timm.

The good performance of the Superman/Batman: Public Enemies release has led Warner Premiere and DC Universe to release a sequel, Superman/Batman: Apocalypse, based on the Superman/Batman comic storyline "The Supergirl from Krypton". It was released on September 28, 2010.

References

External links

 
 
 Superman/Batman: Public Enemies @ The World's Finest

2009 animated films
Animated Batman films
Animated Superman films
DC Universe Animated Original Movies
Films based on works by Jeph Loeb
Films set in Tokyo
2009 direct-to-video films
2009 films
2000s American animated films
2000s animated superhero films
Films directed by Sam Liu
Warner Bros. Animation animated films
Warner Bros. direct-to-video animated films
Films about extraterrestrial life
Animated science fiction films
2009 science fiction films
American vigilante films
Films about fictional presidents of the United States
Japan in non-Japanese culture
2000s English-language films